Frannie is a given name. It is generally a feminine name used as a nickname for Frances. The masculine form is Franny. Notable people with the name include:

 Frannie Hughes, fictional character on the soap opera As the World Turns
 Frannie Lindsay, American poet
 Frannie Peabody (1903–2001), HIV/AIDS activist

See also
 Francie